Edward Clark (April 1, 1815May 4, 1880) was the eighth Governor of Texas. His term coincided with the beginning of the American Civil War.

Early life
Edward Clark was born on April 1, 1815 in New Orleans, Louisiana. His father was named Elijah Clark Jr. His paternal uncle, John Clark, served as the Governor of Georgia from 1819 to 1823. His paternal grandfather was Elijah Clarke.

Clark grew up in Georgia. After his father died in the 1830s, he moved to Montgomery, Alabama with his mother and studied the law.

Career
Clark moved to Texas in 1842 and set up a law practice. He served in the Texas Annexation Convention and two terms as a state representative in the Texas Legislature. During the Mexican–American War he served on the staff of Major General J. Pinckney Henderson and fought in the Battle of Monterrey. When the war ended, he served as secretary of state under Governor Elisha M. Pease and as lieutenant governor serving under Governor Sam Houston. When Sam Houston refused to take an oath of allegiance to the Confederacy, Clark became governor.

Among Clark's first actions was to order the surrender of all fire arms and ammunition from private merchants to the state. Furthermore, all privately owned firearms were to be canvassed. Few weapons were ever turned in and most Texans did not comply for fear of future confiscation. (Lone Star by T.R. Fehrenbach, pg 353)

After losing the governor's race by 124 votes to Francis Lubbock, Clark became a colonel in the Texas militia during the American Civil War. In 1863 he joined the Confederate States Army and was commissioned colonel of the 14th Texas Infantry Regiment. He commanded the unit, as part of the Greyhound Division, until being wounded in the Battle of Pleasant Hill. A promotion to brigadier general wasn´t confirmed by the Confederate Congress and he left the service; however, in 1865 he was made a brigadier in the militia. He fled briefly to Mexico at the end of the American Civil War, and returned home to Marshall, Texas.

Personal life

Clark married Lucy Long in 1840, but she died shortly after. He married Martha Melissa Evans in 1849. They had four children, including:
 William Evans Clark (Apr 1849 in Marshall, Harrison County, Texas – Jun 1852 in same);
 John Evans Clark (30 Jan 1852 in Marshall, Harrison County, Texas – 9 Oct 1923 in same), who married twice and had at least three children;
 William Evans Alfred Clark (12 Jul 1853 – 9 Apr 1879); and
 Nannie M Clark (c. 1855 – 8 Jan 1913 Harrison County, Texas), m. 23 Nov 1881 in Harrison County to Daniel C Wallis (alias Wallace).

Death
Clark died on May 4, 1880 in Marshall, Texas. His grave in the Marshall City Cemetery is marked with a historical marker.

See also
 List of American Civil War generals (Acting Confederate)

References

External links
 

1815 births
1880 deaths
19th-century American politicians
American military personnel of the Mexican–American War
Confederate States of America state governors
Confederate States Army officers
Confederate militia generals
Democratic Party governors of Texas
Lieutenant Governors of Texas
People from Marshall, Texas
People of Texas in the American Civil War
Secretaries of State of Texas
Democratic Party Texas state senators
Military personnel from Texas